Neodorcadion laqueatum is a species of beetle in the family Cerambycidae. It was described by Waltl in 1838. It is known from Bulgaria and Turkey.

References

Dorcadiini
Beetles described in 1838